Joanna Lech (born 25 January 1984, in Rzeszów, Poland) – a Polish poet and writer.  Author of Zapaść, Nawroty (nominated for NIKE Literary Award 2011), Trans, Piosenki Pikinierów and Sztuczki (nominated for NIKE Literary Award 2017). Graduate of the Literary-Arts faculty of Jagiellonian University in Kraków. Lives in Kraków.

Works

Novels 
 Sztuczki (Warsaw 2016)

Poetry

 Zapaść (Łódź 2009)
 Nawroty (Poznań 2010)
 Nic z tego / Nothing of this (London 2011)
 Trans (Mikołów 2016)
 Piosenki Pikinierów (Szczecin 2017)

Anthologies

 Poeci na nowy wiek (Wrocław 2010)
 Pociąg do poezji (Kutno 2011)
 Almanach (Lviv 2011)
 Poeci i poetki przekraczają granice. Sto wierszy (Katowice 2011)
 Free Over Blood (London 2011)
 Once Upon a Deadline (London 2012)
 Węzły, sukienki, żagle. Nowa poezja, ojczyzna i dziewczyna (Złoty Środek Poezji, 2013)
 2014. Antologia współczesnych polskich opowiadań (FORMA, 2014)
 Dzikie Dzieci. Antologia laureatów konkursu im. Jacka Bierezina (Dom Literatury in Łódź, 2014)
 Przewodnik po zaminowanym terenie (OPT / IMPART, 2016)
 Scattering the Dark: An Anthology of Polish Women Poets (White Pine Press, 2016)
 Znowu pragnę ciemnej miłości (W.A.B., 2018)

References

External links 
 

Living people
Polish women poets
1984 births
People from Rzeszów
Jagiellonian University alumni
21st-century Polish poets
21st-century Polish novelists
Polish women novelists
21st-century Polish women writers